The Los Angeles Strings were a team tennis franchise in TeamTennis. They were the namesake of the original Los Angeles Strings (1974–78) and were owned by Jerry Buss, who also owned the original team. The Strings played their home matches at The Forum in Inglewood, California. The Strings won the 1981 TeamTennis championship in their inaugural season, and followed up with a second title in 1990.

World Team Tennis suspended operations after the 1978 season, and all the franchises were terminated. The league restarted in 1981, under the new name TeamTennis, with four new expansion franchises, one of which was the Strings. Each team owner paid a US$75,000 franchise fee. Jerry Buss hired his daughter Jeanie Buss, who was 19 years old at the time, to be the general manager of the Strings.

See also

 Los Angeles Strings (1974–1978)

References

Defunct World TeamTennis teams
Sports clubs established in 1981
Strings
Strings
Strings
1981 establishments in California
Sports clubs disestablished in 1993
1993 disestablishments in California